All That is an American comedy television series.

All That may also refer to:

Episodes
List of All That episodes, an episode list
All That (season 1), the first season
All That (season 2), the second season
All That (season 3), the third season
All That (season 4), the fourth season
All That (season 5), the fifth season
All That (season 6), the sixth season
All That (season 7), the seventh season
All That (season 8), the eighth season
All That (season 9), the ninth season
All That (season 10), the tenth season
All That (season 11), the eleventh season

Music
All That: The Album, the soundtrack
All That (album), an album by LeAnn Rimes
"All That" (song), a song by Carly Rae Jepsen
"All That (Lady)", a song by The Game
"All That", a song by Jake Bugg from the album On My One
"All That", a song by Dillon Francis from the album Money Sucks, Friends Rule

Other uses
All That: Fresh out the Box, a book about the TV show
All That Skate, a figure skating show

See also